Tozer is a surname commonly believed to have originated in Devon, South West England. It is a reference to the occupation of carding of wool which was originally performed by the use of teasels (Latin carduus), via the Middle English word tōsen, to tease [out]. The surname has variants, including the lesser-known "Tozier".

The Tozers of Moretonhampstead
According to the Moretonhampstead History Society, the Tozer family was, by 1332, established at Howton, which was part of the manor of Moreton until it was alienated. A 15th-century record in the Public Record Office (C.1/56/207) records a legal dispute between John and William Tozer over "Houghton in the parish of Moreton".

There are several gravestones and a chest tomb to later members of the Tozer family in the churchyard of Moretonhampstead parish church. The properties of Great Howton and Howton Langhill are also recorded as being in the possession of members of the Tozer family.

Notable people with the surname
 A.W. Tozer (1897–1963), American pastor
 Aaron Tozer (1788–1854), British naval officer
 Aiden Wilson Tozer (1897–1963), American Protestant pastor, preacher and author
 Augustus Edmonds Tozer (1857–1910), English composer and organist
 Ben Tozer (born 1990), English footballer, currently playing for Wrexham AFC
 William "Bill" Tozer (1882–1955), baseball player
 Bruce Tozer (1926–2021), Australian cricketer
 Claude Tozer (1890–1920), Australian doctor and cricketer
 Dave Tozer, American music producer, songwriter and musician
 Edwin E. Tozer (born 1943), British computer scientist, management consultant, and author
 Elias Tozer (1825–73), Devon journalist, poet and collector of folk stories.
 Elishama Tozer (1741–1790), New York politician
 Faye Tozer (born 1975) English singer-songwriter with the band Steps
 Geoffrey Tozer (1954–2009), Australian pianist
 Henry Fanshawe Tozer (1829–1916), English writer, teacher, and traveler
 Henry Tozer (priest) (1602–1650), English priest and academic
 Horace Tozer (1844–1916), Australian lawyer and politician
 John Tozer (1922–1990), Australian politician
 Joseph Tozer (1881–1955), British actor
 Keith Tozer, American soccer player
 Kira Tozer, Canadian voice actress
 Norman Tozer (1934–2010), British television and radio presenter and reporter
 Solomon Tozer (disappeared 1848), Sergeant of Royal Marines
 Tim Tozer (born 1959), British businessman
 Vivian Tozer (1870–1954), Australian politician
 William Tozer (1829–1899), British clergyman, bishop of Nyasaland
 Phil Tozer - colorectal surgeon

References

English-language surnames